Mdoe is an administrative ward in Handeni Town Council of Tanga Region in Tanzania. 
According to the 2012 census, the ward has a total population of 9,541. Mode is also the seat of Handeni Town government as all the district council's administration offices are located there.

References

Wards of Tanga Region